Schmölln is a town in Thuringia, Germany
Schmölln may also refer to:
 , a settlement (Ortsteil) of the municipality Hummelshain in the Saale Orla-Kreis in Thuringia
 , an Ortsteil of the municipality Randowtal in the district Uckermark in Brandenburg
 , an Ortsteil of the municipality Schmölln-Putzkau in the district of Bautzen in Saxony